Panamanians (Spanish: Panameños) are people identified with Panama, a transcontinental country in Central America (a region within North America) and South America, whose connection may be residential, legal, historical, or cultural. For most Panamanians, several or all of these connections exist and are collectively the source of their Panamanian identity. Panama is a multilingual and multicultural society, home to people of many different ethnicities and religions. Therefore, many Panamanians do not equate their nationality with ethnicity, but with citizenship and allegiance to Panama. The overwhelming majority of Panamanians are the product of varying degrees of admixture between European ethnic groups (predominantly Spaniards) with native Amerindians who are indigenous to Panama's modern territory.

The culture held in common by most Panamanians is referred to as mainstream Panamanian culture, a culture largely derived from the traditions of the Indigenous people and the early Spanish settlers, along with other Europeans arriving later such as Italians, with west African culture as another important component.

Culture

The culture of Panama derived from the cultures of Indigenous peoples of Panama, art and traditions, as well as African Culture that were brought over by the Spanish to Panama. Hegemonic forces have created hybrid forms of this by blending African and Native American culture with European culture. For example, the tamborito is a Spanish dance with that was blended with Native American rhythms and dance moves. Dance is a symbol of the diverse cultures that have coupled in Panama.
The culture, customs, and language of the Panamanians are predominantly Caribbean and Spanish.

Ethnic groups

Mestizo

Mestizo Panamanians are Panamanian people who are of mixed of both European and indigenous ancestry. Mestizos are the majority in Panama, accounting for 70% of the country's population.

Amerindian

Black

Afro-Panamanians played a significant role in the creation of the republic.  The descendants of the Africans who arrived during the colonial era are intermixed in the general population or live in small Afro-Panamanian communities along the Atlantic Coast and in villages within the Darién jungle. Most of the people in Darien are fishermen or small-scale farmers growing crops such as bananas, rice and coffee as well as raising livestock. Other Afro-Panamanians descend from later migrants from the Caribbean who came to work on railroad-construction projects, commercial agricultural enterprises, and (especially) the canal. Important Afro-Caribbean community areas include towns and cities such as Colón, Cristobal and Balboa, in the former Canal Zone, as well as the Río Abajo area of Panama City. Another region with a large Afro-Caribbean population is the province of Bocas del Toro on the Caribbean coast just south of Costa Rica.

Most of the Panamanian population of West Indian descent owe their presence in the country to the monumental efforts to build the Panama Canal in the late 19th and early 20th centuries. Three-quarters of the 50,000 workers who built the canal were Afro Caribbean migrants from the British West Indies. Thousands of Afro-Caribbean workers were recruited from Jamaica, Barbados and Trinidad.

White or Europeans

White Panamanians form 6.7%, with the majority being of Spanish descent. Other ancestries includes Dutch, English, French, German, Swiss, Danish, Irish, Greek, Italian, Lebanese, Portuguese, Turkish, Polish, Russian and Ukrainian. There is also a sizable and very influential Jewish community.

Asian

Panama, partly owing to its historical reliance on commerce, is an ethnically diverse society. It has considerable populations of Afro-Antillean and Chinese origin. The first Chinese immigrated to Panama from southern China to help build the Panama Railroad in the 19th century. There followed several waves of immigrants whose descendants number around 50,000. Starting in the 1970s, a further 80,000 have immigrated from other parts of China as well.

Languages
Spanish is the official and dominant language. About 93% of the population speak Spanish as their first language, though many citizens speak both English and Spanish or native languages, such as Ngäbere. Many languages, including seven indigenous languages, are also spoken in Panama. English is sometimes spoken by many professionals and those working in the business or governmental sectors of society.

Religion

The government of Panama does not collect statistics on the religious affiliation of citizens, but various sources estimate that 75 to 85 percent of the population identifies itself as Roman Catholic and 15 to 25 percent as evangelical Christian. The Baháʼí Faith community of Panama is estimated at 2.00% of the national population, or about 60,000 including about 10% of the Guaymí population; the Baháʼís maintain one of the world's eight Baháʼí Houses of Worship in Panama.

See also

List of Panamanians
Panama
Ethnic groups in Central America
Panamanian Americans
Hispanics

References

External links
Family life in Panama

 
Central American people by nationality
Demographics of Panama